The 2019–20 season was the 121st season in Associazione Calcio Milan's history and their 86th (109th overall) in the top-flight of Italian football. Milan competed in Serie A and in the Coppa Italia. Milan would have also qualified for the UEFA Europa League but was later excluded due to financial fair play issues.

Facts and events
On 28 May 2019, head coach Gennaro Gattuso announced he would be leaving the club despite being under contract until 2021. On the same day, also sporting director Leonardo announced his resignation.

New society layout was defined on 14 June when iconic former players Paolo Maldini and Zvonimir Boban signed respectively as technical director and technical support. On following 19 June Marco Giampaolo was signed as coach, while 2 days later Frederic Massara signed as sporting director

On 28 June 2019, Milan have been excluded from the 2019–20 UEFA Europa League as a result of Financial Fair Play breaches.

On 8 October 2019, Milan dismissed coach Marco Giampaolo (due to poor results) after only 3 months of employment. On the following day, Stefano Pioli was announced as his substitute.

On 7 March 2020, it was announced that the contract with the club's "Chief Football Officer" Zvonimir Boban had been terminated. A week prior to his dismissal, Boban was interviewed by La Gazzetta dello Sport and criticized the club's CEO Ivan Gazidis over rumors involving him signing a secret pre-contract deal with football manager Ralf Rangnick for the following season. After Boban's dismissal was officialized, the club's chairman Paolo Scaroni stated his support of Gazidis. However, on 21 July 2020, the contract with current coach Stefano Pioli was extended until conclusion of the 2021/22 season.

Players

Squad information

.

Transfers

Summer window

In

On loan

Loan returns

Total spending:  €111,8M

Out

Loans ended

Loans out

Total income:  €35,5M

Winter window

In

Loans in

Loan returns

Total spending:  €3,5M

Out

Loans out

Total income: €30M

Pre-season and friendlies

International Champions Cup

Friendlies

Competitions

Serie A

League table

Results summary

Results by round

Matches

Coppa Italia

Statistics

Appearances and goals

|-
! colspan=14 style=background:#dcdcdc; text-align:center| Goalkeepers

|-
! colspan=14 style=background:#dcdcdc; text-align:center| Defenders

|-
! colspan=14 style=background:#dcdcdc; text-align:center| Midfielders

 
                        

|-
! colspan=14 style=background:#dcdcdc; text-align:center| Forwards

|-
! colspan=14 style=background:#dcdcdc; text-align:center| Players transferred out during the season

Goal scorers

In italics players that left the team during the season.

Assists

In italics players that left the team during the season.

Clean sheets

Disciplinary record

In italics players that left the team during the season.

References

A.C. Milan seasons
Milan